KIPP: Delta Collegiate High School is a comprehensive public charter high school serving students in grades nine through twelve in Helena-West Helena, Arkansas, United States.

Curriculum 
Based on the KIPP network of free, open-enrollment, college-preparatory schools, the KIPP curriculum meets or exceeds the Smart Core curriculum developed the Arkansas Department of Education (ADE), which requires students to complete 22 credit units before graduation. Students engage in regular and Advanced Placement (AP) coursework and exams, preparatory courses in ACT/SAT testing, leadership workshops, and partnerships with local colleges and universities.

Extracurricular activities 
The KIPP: Delta Collegiate High School school colors are blue and white. The KIPP Delta Collegiate participate in various interscholastic activities in the 1A 5 North Conference administered by the Arkansas Activities Association. The school athletic activities include basketball (boys/girls), cross country (boys/girls), soccer (boys only), track (boys/girls), and volleyball.

References

External links 

 

Public high schools in Arkansas
Charter schools in Arkansas
Schools in Phillips County, Arkansas